The 1996 World Badminton Grand Prix was the 14th edition of the World Badminton Grand Prix finals. It was held in Denpasar, Bali, Indonesia, from December 4 to December 8, 1996. The prize money was US$ 350,000.

Final results

Results

Women's Doubles

Women's singles

References
Smash: World Grand Prix Finals, Bali 1996

World Grand Prix
World Badminton Grand Prix
B
Badminton tournaments in Indonesia